Falcaria lacertinaria, the scalloped hook-tip, is a moth of the family Drepanidae. The species was first described by Carl Linnaeus in his 1758 10th edition of Systema Naturae It is found in Europe and Anatolia then east to Eastern Siberia. 

The wingspan is 27–35 mm. The forewings are  ochreous,mixed and strigulated with dark fuscous. The veins are darker . The first and second lines are dark fuscous, nearly straight and parallel.There is a black discal dot and the wing apex is suffused with ochreous-brown. The termen is irregularly dentate. The cilia are blackish, spotted with white.The hind wings are whitish- ochreous, fuscous -sprinkled and posteriorly brownish -tinged with a faint grey postmedian line and a dark fuscous discal dot.The larva is ochreous-brown, darker marked. The dorsal line is anteriorly pale, dark-edged, posteriorly dark and interrupted. There are two blackish dorsal marks on segment 6, preceded by a pale area and pairs of tubercular prominences on 3, 4, and 12. The first generation may be more silvery-grey, the second generation smaller and lighter brown.

The moth flies from April to August in two generations depending on the location.

The larvae feed on birch and alder.

References

External links
Fauna Europaea
Lepidoptera of Belgium
Vlindernet.nl 

Moths described in 1758
Drepaninae
Drepanid moths of Great Britain
Moths of Europe
Moths of Asia
Taxa named by Carl Linnaeus